Comesella is a genus of fungi in the class Dothideomycetes. The relationship of this taxon to other taxa within the class is unknown (incertae sedis). Also, the placement of this genus within the Dothideomycetes is uncertain. A monotypic genus, it contains the single species Comesella anomala.

See also 
 List of Dothideomycetes genera incertae sedis

References

External links 
 Index Fungorum

Dothideomycetes enigmatic taxa
Monotypic Dothideomycetes genera